Relevent Sports Group (RSG) is a New York City-based sports media company and promoter of sporting events. It owns and operates the International Champions Cup. According to the New York Times, RSG is one of the two largest soccer promoters in the US. In Europe RSG has been described as one of the most important companies promoting soccer in the US. The company was founded in 2012 by RSE Ventures, and is owned and was co-founded by Stephen M. Ross, owner of the Miami Dolphins.

History

International Champions Cup
The RSG company owns and operates the International Champions Cup, a pre-season tournament in which European soccer teams play in the United States, Europe and Asia. Due to RSG's work, European soccer clubs including Germany's FC Bayern Munich, France's  Lyon, UK's  Chelsea and Borussia Dortmund are regular guests in the US. 

The Men's ICC has been on since 2013. In 2017 the Men's ICC included the first pre-season El Clásico - a game between Barcelona and Real Madrid - in the US, and the second outside Spain.

In 2018 the RSG added a women’s ICC tournament, the  Women’s ICC, and an international youth tournament, the ICC Futures.

The 2019 men's ICC event played 18 matches in 17 locations around the world and included Real Madrid, Juventus, Bayern Munich and Manchester United.

In early April 2020, RSG cancelled its scheduled 2020 ICC due to the coronavirus pandemic.

In 2021, RSG launched the inaugural WICC Best XI, which is an annual award given to the athletes, executives, journalists, coaches, and other individuals who are doing the most to advance women's soccer. The 2021 Best XI list included 13 people. Four players – Formiga, Alexis Putellas, Quinn, and Christine Sinclair. Two coaches – Emma Hayes and Monika Staab. Three executives – Nadine Kessler, Meskerem Goshime, and Tom Corbett. One journalist – Suzy Wrack. One activist group with three people: Mana Shim, Sinead Farrelly, and Kaiya McCullough.

This best list was selected by an advisory board composed of the following soccer and sports icons:  Vero Boquete, Moya Dodd, Lori Lindsey, Meg Linehan, Heather O'Reilly, Bibi Steinhaus-Webb and Grant Wahl.

In January 2021, RSG signed a three-year ICC ticketing and men's event sponsorship partnership with Stage Front.

In August 2022, the RSG ran the  Women's ICC in Portland Oregon USA for the second year in a row.

Other promotions
In August 2018 RSG signed a 15-year joint venture deal with La Liga, called La Liga North America, which promotes soccer in Canada and the US.

In April 2019 RSG sued the United States Soccer Federation in the Supreme Court of New York. The lawsuit stated that the Federation was threatening RSG's soccer promotion business after it denied two RSG proposals to have foreign league and cup matches at Hard Rock Stadium in Miami. The suit also claims that the US Soccer Federation has a conflict of interest in sanctioning professional games. In July 2020 the suit was dismissed by US District Judge Valerie Caproni, who advised RSG to either refile the suit or take its case to arbitration. In September 2020 the United States Department of Justice entered the dispute, warning FIFA that banning popular soccer games in the US could be a breach of US anti-trust laws.

RSG has attracted attention in Spain after FIFA and the US Soccer Federation denied permission to play an official Liga de Fútbol Profesional game in 2019.

In April 2020, the company partnered with La Liga and LeBron James' media company Uninterrupted to host “Kick COVID FIFA 20,” an esports soccer tournament which included sixteen members of the NBA, NFL, La Liga and the National Women’s Soccer League. The player-only event was a fundraiser for the “Feeding America” non-profit organization as a response to the COVID-19 pandemic. Fans could watch the event on a variety of social media platforms.

In October 2020, RSG became a minority partner in a consortium (including Bain Capital and Nb Renaissance) formed to secure the US television rights to Italian football.

In November 2020, in partnership with Film 45, RSG released its first full-length documentary on ESPN called, "My Name Is Ada Hegerberg," about the Norwegian female soccer player.

Additionally in 2020, RSG developed a women's-focused content strategy with new original programming, including "The Fixture by the WICC." This is a weekly dedicated digital show of women's soccer highlights, news, transfers, and players to watch.

References 

Companies based in New York City
2012 establishments in New York City
Soccer in the United States